Whiskey Bent and Hell Bound is the thirtieth studio album by American country music artist Hank Williams Jr. and his fourth on the Elektra/Curb labels. The full-length album was Williams' second of 1979, with Family Tradition released in April.

Reception
Released in November 1979, Whiskey Bent and Hell Bound peaked at number 5 on the Billboard Top Country Albums chart, his second consecutive Top 5 for the label and only his second Top 5 album since 1969's Live at Cobo Hall. It was certified Platinum by the RIAA, marking it as his third Gold album certification and his first Platinum album. The album generated two major hit singles, the title track and "Women I've Never Had", that peaked at number 2 and number 5 on the Billboard Hot Country Singles & Tracks chart and would become two of Williams' most well known and popular songs.

Reviewing in Christgau's Record Guide: Rock Albums of the Seventies (1981), Robert Christgau wrote: "At times his son-of-an-outlaw obsession is worse than shtick, but here he does justice to the formula. Two candid songs about women tell you more about his sexism than he knows himself, two others explain why he's in that mood, the covers from Gregg Allman and George Jones define his parameters, and 'The Conversation'—with Waylon Guess Who, about Guess Who, Sr.—doesn't make you gag once." In 2006, CMT ranked it #16 on its list of the top 40 albums in country music history.

Track listing
All songs written by Hank Williams, Jr., except where noted.
 
 "Whiskey Bent and Hell Bound"  3:09
 "Tired of Being Johnny B. Good"  2:35      
 "Outlaw Women"  3:02 
 "(I Don't Have) Anymore Love Songs"  2:24 
 "White Lightnin'"  (J.P. Richardson) 2:21
 "Women I've Never Had"  2:52    
 "O.D.'d in Denver"   2:40
 "Come and Go Blues"  (Gregg Allman)  4:05
 "Old Nashville Cowboy"  (Rock Killough, Billy Earl McClelland)  3:04
 "The Conversation" (Richie Albright, Waylon Jennings, Hank Williams, Jr.)  3:51

Singles

Personnel
Hank Williams, Jr. - vocals, acoustic guitar
James Burton, Rock Killough - acoustic guitar
James Burton, Reggie Young - electric guitar
David Briggs, Larry Knechtel - keyboards
Joe Osborn - bass
Larrie Londin - drums, percussion
Kieran Kane - mandolin
Rock Killough - harmonica
Buddy Spicher - viola
John Gore, Jim Horn, Irving Kane, Terry Mead, Muscle Shoals Horns - horns
Waylon Jennings - vocals on "The Conversation"

Production
Produced By Jimmy Bowen
Engineered By Jimmy Bowen & Ron Treat
Ethan Russell - photography

References

External links
 Hank Williams, Jr's Official Website
 Record Label
  Whiskey Bent and Hell Bound album at CMT.com

Hank Williams Jr. albums
1979 albums
Albums produced by Jimmy Bowen
Curb Records albums